__notoc__
The Cinema of Transgression is a term coined by Nick Zedd in 1985 to describe a New York City-based underground film movement, consisting of a loose-knit group of artists using shock value and black humor in their films. Key players in this movement were Zedd, Kembra Pfahler, Tessa Hughes-Freeland, Casandra Stark, Beth B, Tommy Turner, Jon Moritsugu, Manuel DeLanda, David Wojnarowicz, Richard Kern, and Lydia Lunch, who in the late 1970s and mid-1980s began to make very low-budget films using cheap 8 mm cameras.

Zedd outlined his philosophy on the Cinema of Transgression in The Cinema of Transgression Manifesto, published under the name Orion Jeriko in the zine The Underground Film Bulletin (1984–90).

Cinema of Transgression continues to heavily influence underground filmmakers. In 2000, the British Film Institute showed a retrospective of the movement's work introduced by those involved in the production of the original video films.

List of notable films
Why Do You Exist (Nick Zedd, 1998) 
You Killed Me First (Richard Kern, 1985) 
Where Evil Dwells (David Wojnarowicz & Tommy Turner, 1985)
Raw Nerves: A Lacanian Thriller (Manuel DeLanda, 1980)
Mommy, Mommy, Where's My Brain? (Jon Moritsugu, 1986)
Llik Your Idols (Angélique Bosio, 2007)
Wrecked on Cannibal Island (Casandra Stark, 1986)
Stigmata (Beth B., 1991)
Blank City (Celine Danhier, 2009)
Nymphomania (Tessa Hughes-Freeland and Holly Adams, 1993)

See also
 Cinema of the world
 No Wave Cinema
 Transgressive art
 Extreme cinema
 Vulgar auteurism

Notes

References

External links
 Films from the Cinema of Transgression at UbuWeb.
 

Experimental film
American art
Movements in cinema
Underground culture
1980s in film
1990s in film
2000s in film